Luke Gallichan (born 2 April 1995) is a cricketer who plays for Jersey. He played in the 2013 ICC World Cricket League Division Six tournament and the 2016 ICC World Cricket League Division Four matches held in Los Angeles.

References

External links
 

1995 births
Living people
Jersey cricketers
Place of birth missing (living people)